Ivan Vikulovich Morozov (28 August 1865 - 2 November 1933) was Russian business person active in the later period of the Russian Empire. He was part of the influential Old Believer family, the Morozovs.

He was the son of Vikul Eliseevich Morozov.

References

1865 births
1933 deaths
Businesspeople from the Russian Empire
Old Believers
19th-century businesspeople from the Russian Empire